Rencontres du Film Court Madagascar, also called RFC, is the only film festival in Madagascar.

The Festival was founded in 2006 by Laza, a malagasy filmmaker and producer, and is organised by L'Association Rencontres du Film Court, the Institut Français de Madagascar and Rozifilms. It is held annually in Antananarivo, the capital of Madagascar. Since 2017, RFC On Tour was included, it is about sharing Malagasy films around the country and aiming to push on writers, filmmakers, and producers.
In 2013 the festival welcomed around 12.000 visitors and is still constantly growing. During the 13. edition of RFC around 25.000 visitors have been counted.

The festivals main focus besides offering free screenings to the public is to step in for a non-existing film school and provide cinematographic knowledge. Every year several meetings and workshops come along with the screenings.

As there is no cinema in whole Madagascar RFCs main screening venue is the building of Institut Français de Madagascar. Additional screenings are held in the open air or at IKMalagasy.

Festival programme 
During 9 days around 350 films are presented in over 30 Screenings. Besides many non-competition screenings, 3 official competition screenings are composed.

Compétition officielle Fiction - Malagasy live action short films

Compétition officielle Documentaire - Malagasy documentary films

Compétition officielle Animation Panafricaine - African animated short films

Awards 

The Award of RFC is called Zebu d'or.

Awards are handed out to the winner of every competition category. A fourth additional Zebu d'or is awarded to the winner of the category "public choice".

External links 
 http://www.rencontresdufilmcourt.mg/
 https://www.facebook.com/Rencontresdufilmcourt
 http://www.rozifilms.com/
 http://www.institutfrancais-madagascar.com/

References 

Film festivals established in 2006
Film festivals in Africa
Festivals in Madagascar